The Seyrantepe Dam is an earth-fill embankment dam on the Peri River (a tributary of the Euphrates), located  northwest of Karakoçan on the border of Elazığ and Tunceli Provinces, Turkey. Its primary purpose is hydroelectric power generation and is the fifth dam in the Peri River cascade. Construction on the dam began in 2003 and its power station was commissioned in 2008. It contains two 29.39 MW Francis turbine-generators for a total installed capacity of 58.78 MW. It is owned and operated by Limak Energy and Bilgin Energy.

At the opening of the hydro plant, President (then-Prime Minister) Recep Tayyip Erdoğan used the opportunity to attack environmentalist critics, a campaign he sustained in office: he said 
 "While making these investments we are also taking the natural life into consideration. We know that most of the [environmentalist] criticisms in the media in this regard are ideological. On the other hand, we are already taking reasonable and sincere criticisms into account and we are examining them. Just like in the case where we consider the balance between democracy and security, we are continuing our balanced approach between development and environment. No one shall have any doubts on this. But we should not forget; while preaching environment, we should not forget to say that humans come first. Because humans come before anything else. The living conditions of our people are very crucial for us."
Speech during the opening ceremony of the Seyrantepe Hydroelectricity Plant,  Peri Suyu

See also

Pembelik Dam – upstream
Tatar Dam – downstream

References

Dams in Elazığ Province
Hydroelectric power stations in Turkey
Earth-filled dams
Dams completed in 2008
Energy infrastructure completed in 2008
Dams in Tunceli Province
Dams on the Peri River
21st-century architecture in Turkey